The 2004–05 New Orleans Hornets season was the franchise's third season in the National Basketball Association. The Hornets moved from the Eastern Conference's Central Division to the tougher Southwest Division of the Western Conference for the season. Under new head coach Byron Scott, the Hornets played and suffered their worst basketball ways losing their first eight games, which led to an awful 2–29 start. Many players were traded away during the season. The team traded David Wesley to the Houston Rockets in December, then midway through the season dealt Baron Davis to the Golden State Warriors, and sent Jamal Mashburn, who was lost for the entire season with a knee injury, to the Philadelphia 76ers for Glenn Robinson, who never played for the Hornets and was released to free agency and signed with the San Antonio Spurs. Mashburn would never suit up for the 76ers.

The Hornets continued to struggle, losing their final nine games finishing last place in the Southwest Division with a dreadful 18–64 record, which was the same record as the newly-rechristened Charlotte Bobcats. They failed to qualify for the playoffs for the first time in franchise history.

For this season, they added new yellow road alternate uniform they remained in used until 2008.

Offseason
On June 16, the Hornets claimed Brazilian swingman Alex Garcia on waivers from the San Antonio Spurs. On June 22, the 2004 NBA Expansion Draft took place, and the Hornets lost guard Maurice Carter to the Charlotte Bobcats. Two days later, the NBA Draft took place.

Draft picks

In the draft, the Hornets drafted J. R. Smith and Tim Pickett. Smith would play only two seasons with the Hornets, and Pickett would not play in the NBA. On July 19, the Hornets signed Chris Andersen. Andersen would be with the Hornets for four seasons, missing the 2006–07 season due to a suspension for substance abuse. On August 3, the Hornets signed former Sixth Man of the Year Rodney Rogers. Rogers would be traded to the Philadelphia 76ers, along with Jamal Mashburn, on February 24 for Glenn Robinson. On September 29, the Hornets signed Tremaine Fowlkes and Britton Johnsen. The following day, the team signed Lorinza "Junior" Harrington and Lee Nailon. On October 28, the Hornets waived Fowlkes, and three days later, they waived Johnsen.

Roster

Regular season

Standings

Record vs. opponents

Game log

Player statistics

Transactions

Trades

Free agents

References

New Orleans Hornets on Basketball Reference

New Orleans Hornets seasons